Taki Mrabet (born 28 February 1989, in Paris) is a Tunisian swimmer who competed at the 2012 Summer Olympics.  He competed in the men's 200 and 40 m individual medley.

References

Tunisian male swimmers
1989 births
Living people
Olympic swimmers of Tunisia
Swimmers at the 2012 Summer Olympics
Male medley swimmers

Mediterranean Games bronze medalists for Tunisia
Swimmers at the 2013 Mediterranean Games
African Games gold medalists for Tunisia
African Games medalists in swimming
African Games silver medalists for Tunisia
African Games bronze medalists for Tunisia
Mediterranean Games medalists in swimming
Competitors at the 2007 All-Africa Games
Competitors at the 2011 All-Africa Games
20th-century Tunisian people
21st-century Tunisian people